The Library of Virginia in Richmond, Virginia, is the library agency of the Commonwealth of Virginia. It serves as the archival agency and the reference library for Virginia's seat of government. The Library moved into a new building in 1997 and is located at 800 East Broad Street, two blocks from the Virginia State Capitol building. It was formerly known as the Virginia State Library and as the Virginia State Library and Archives.

Formally founded by the Virginia General Assembly in 1823, the Library of Virginia organizes, cares for, and manages the state's collection of books and official records, many of which date back to the early colonial period. It houses what is believed to be the most comprehensive collection of materials on Virginia government, history, and culture available anywhere. Its research collections contain more than 808,500 bound volumes; 678,790 public documents; 410,330 microforms, including 45,684 reels of microfilmed newspapers; 308,900 photographs and other pictorial materials; 101.8 million manuscript items and records; and several hundred thousand prints, broadsides, and newspapers.

History of the institution
Although the Library of Virginia was officially established January 23, 1823, its history goes back to the collection of materials acquired for official use by the colonial Council and subsequent colonial and state authorities. The first permanent home of the Library was a small room on the top floor of the State Capitol. The state's books and records eventually outgrew this space, and overflow books and documents were then stored in several rented locations across Richmond.

In an 1851 survey by the Smithsonian, the library was listed as having 14,000 volumes.

In 1892, the General Assembly provided for a new Virginia State Library on Capitol Square in what is today known as the Oliver Hill Building. Over the ensuing forty years, the Library again outgrew that building, and in 1940 it moved to its third location at the edge of Capitol Square between 11th and Governor Streets (today the Patrick Henry Executive Office Building). It shared this space with the State Law Library, the Virginia Supreme Court of Appeals, the Virginia Department of Law, and the Office of the Attorney General.

The Library moved to its current location at 800 East Broad Street in 1997. The old library buildings were listed on the National Register of Historic Places in 2008 and 2005, respectively.

The state library houses one of the most comprehensive collections on Virginia. The collection covers Virginia government, history, and culture. The collection focuses on the varied past of the commonwealth, documenting the lives of important and ordinary Virginians and their deeds. The collections include printed material, manuscripts and photographic collections. The Library also supplies research and reference assistance to state officials; consulting services to state and local government agencies and to other Virginia public libraries; administers numerous federal, state, and local grant programs; publishes award-winning books; provides educational programs and resources on Virginia history; and offers exhibitions, lectures, and book-signings.

Programs and publications
Since 1998, the Library of Virginia and the Library of Virginia Foundation have sponsored the annual Library of Virginia Literary Awards honoring outstanding Virginia authors and books about Virginia in the areas of fiction, nonfiction, and poetry. They also present annually a lifetime achievement award, whose past recipients are Ellen Glasgow (1998), Edgar Allan Poe (1999), Anne Spencer (2000), Booker T. Washington (2001), Mary Lee Settle (2002), Louis D. Rubin, Jr. (2003), George Garrett (2004), Merrill D. Peterson (2005), William Styron (2006), Tom Wolfe (2007), Rita Dove (2008), John Grisham (2009), Lee Smith (2010), Earl Hamner, Jr. (2011), Tim Robbins (2012), Charles Wright (2013), and Barbara Kingsolver (2014).

The Library of Virginia sponsors the annual Virginia Women in History project to honor eight Virginia women, living and dead, who have made extraordinary contributions to the state or to their professions and also the annual African American Trailblazers in Virginia project.

Library of Virginia hosts the Virginia Literary Festival. This event attracts authors, publishers, and residents of Virginia. Attendees get the chance to meet new authors as well as well known authors. The library awards seven different literary awards at their annual event.

Archives Month focuses on institutions and individuals that have made significant impact on the preservation and accessibility of historical records. In conjunction with the Archive Month the Library of Virginia produces posters commemorating archival and special collections repositories throughout the state. Many archives contribute to the celebration by hosting events.

Library of Virginia hosts an ongoing series of Book Talk Series. These book talks feature authors from Virginia and books on the state of Virginia. These are hosted nearly every week and the cover a wide range of topics: from Virginia's role in the founding of the United States to the legacy of the Civil War to the many facets of the civil rights struggle in Virginia. The audience is given the opportunity to listen and interact with a variety of scholars and literary authors.

The Library's Virginia Heritage Resource Center offers a series of lectures by researchers and subject specialists showcasing the contents of the library's collection and its potential as a resource for researchers.

Library of Virginia offers a variety of workshops each year for anyone who works in library services. These workshops and conferences are designed to help hone skills and develop new approaches. These workshops cover topics such as serving special needs patrons, cataloging databases, and reference services.

In 2007 and 2008 work began on the Virginia Memory project, which serves as an extension of the Library of Virginia's online presence. The project launched in 2009 and has four components, the Library's digital collections, online versions of the Library's exhibitions, an online classroom, and a "reading room" that offers a chronology of Virginia events, articles by Library archivists, and "This Day in Virginia History". The Transcribe program is a collaborative workspace for people to help the Library transcribe documents.
In August 2015 the project expanded to include the Document Bank of Virginia, which hosts select documents along with historical context for educational use.

State Librarians of Virginia

During the nineteenth century, Secretaries of the Commonwealth usually oversaw the state library as part of their official duties.

 John Pendleton Kennedy, 1903–1907
 Henry Read McIlwaine, 1907–1934
 Wilmer L. Hall, 1934–1946
 Randolph Warner Church, 1947–1972
 Donald Rucker Haynes, 1972–1986
 Ella Gaines Yates, 1986–1990
 John C. Tyson, 1990–1994
 Nolan T. Yelitch, 1995–2007
 Sandra Gioia Treadway, 2007–present

References

Further reading
 Sandra Gioia Treadway and Edward D. C. Campbell Jr., eds. The Common Wealth: Treasures from the Collection of the Library of Virginia. Richmond: The Library of Virginia, 1997. .
 Trenton E. Hizer, comp., Guide to the Personal Papers Collection at the Library of Virginia. Richmond: The Library of Virginia, 2008.  .

External links
 The Library of Virginia (official site)
 Find It Virginia (official research tool)
 Virginia Memory (digital collections)
The Uncommonwealth: Voices from the Library of Virginia (blog)
 Document Bank of Virginia
 Multiple Exposure:  Catablog of the Prints and Photographs Collection at the Library of Virginia (blog)
 Virginia Heritage:  Guides to Manuscript and Archival Collections in Virginia
 Debra H. Rodman, "Retelling Virginia's Migration History", Southern Spaces, 25 October 2010. A review of an exhibition at the Library of Virginia.

1823 establishments in Virginia
Government agencies established in 1823
Government of Virginia
History of Virginia
Virginia